Sons of Liberty is an American television miniseries dramatizing the early American Revolution events in Boston, Massachusetts, the start of the Revolutionary War, and the negotiations of the Second Continental Congress which resulted in drafting and signing the 1776 United States Declaration of Independence in Philadelphia, Pennsylvania. The three-part miniseries premiered on History on January 25, 2015, directed by Kari Skogland. The theme music was composed by Hans Zimmer.

Plot
The miniseries is set in the years 1765–1776, prior to start of the American Revolutionary War. It focuses on historical figures and pivotal events between the Thirteen Colonies and Great Britain, particularly the events that led to resistance to the crown and creation of the Sons of Liberty. The actions of the Sons of Liberty were the beginnings of the Continental Army, and these take place mostly around Boston in the Province of Massachusetts Bay.

Various American Revolutionary figures are protagonists in episodes, such as Samuel Adams, John Adams, Benjamin Franklin, John Hancock, Paul Revere, George Washington and the British General Thomas Gage. The episodes depict the creation of the Continental Congress, the Declaration of Independence and the outbreak of the Revolutionary War.

Cast and characters
 Ben Barnes as Samuel "Sam" Adams
 Marton Csokas as General Thomas Gage
 Ryan Eggold as Dr. Joseph Warren
 Michael Raymond-James as Paul Revere
 Rafe Spall as John Hancock
 Henry Thomas as John Adams
 Jason O'Mara as George Washington
 Dean Norris as Benjamin Franklin
 Emily Berrington as Margaret Kemble Gage
 Sean Gilder as Thomas Hutchinson
 Kevin J. Ryan as John Pitcairn
 Shane Taylor as Captain Thomas Preston
 Jimmy Akingbola as Peter Salem
 John Voce as Ebenezer Richardson

Episodes

Production

According to The Hollywood Reporter, production on Sons of Liberty began in the summer of 2014. The miniseries was also going to feature the minor story lines of Benedict Arnold and Patrick Henry.

Release
The first teaser trailer was released on September 1, 2014, during Houdini, which incorrectly revealed a December 2014 release date and featured The Rolling Stones' "Paint It Black".

In Australia, Sons of Liberty aired on SBS One from February 5, 2015 as a six-part series.

In the United Kingdom, Sons of Liberty aired on History Channel from June 2, 2015, also as a six-part series.

Home media
Sons of Liberty was released on DVD and Blu-ray on May 26, 2015.

Reception

Historical accuracy
The History Channel billed the series as a "dramatic interpretation of events" and a work of "historical fiction", arguing the goal of the miniseries was "to capture the spirit of the time, convey the personalities of the main characters, and focus on real events that have shaped our past". The series has attracted criticism for its historical inaccuracies.

See also
 List of television series and miniseries about the American Revolution
 List of films about the American Revolution

References

External links

 
 

2015 American television series debuts
2015 American television series endings
2010s American drama television miniseries
American biographical series
English-language television shows
Films about presidents of the United States
Cultural depictions of George Washington
Cultural depictions of Thomas Jefferson
Cultural depictions of Benjamin Franklin
Cultural depictions of John Adams
Cultural depictions of John Quincy Adams
Cultural depictions of Samuel Adams
Cultural depictions of John Hancock
Cultural depictions of Paul Revere
History (American TV channel) original programming
Historical television series
Television series about the American Revolution
Television series based on actual events
Television shows directed by Kari Skogland
Television shows set in Boston
Television shows scored by Hans Zimmer